The 1973 World 600, the 14th running of the event, was a NASCAR Winston Cup Series racing event that was held on May 27, 1973, at Charlotte Motor Speedway in Concord, North Carolina.

Summary
The grid consisted of 40 drivers. Alton Jones would finish in last place due to an engine problem on lap 2 out of the 400 laps that made up the race. Buddy Baker defeated David Pearson by 1.8 seconds in front of 85,000 spectators.  Baker made history as he became the first driver to both win this race two years in a row and win the race three times. Six cautions slowed the race for 48 laps. There were 23 different leaders. The race lasted four hours and twenty-six seconds.

Other drivers in the top ten included: Cale Yarborough, Bobby Isaac, Benny Parsons, Jim Vandiver, Darrell Waltrip, Cecil Gordon, Dick Brooks, and David Sisco. Ed Negre (#08), David Ray Boggs (#8) and Charlie Roberts failed to qualify for the race.

Peter Gregg had a terrible crash early in the race in the final race for Cotton Owens' famous red #6 Dodges, then Vic Parsons would have had hard crash later on in the race.

Notable crew chiefs in the race were Tim Brewer, Jake Elder, Travis Carter, Harry Hyde, Dale Inman, Vic Ballard, Tom Vandiver, and Bud Moore.

On the day of the race, 0.01 inches of precipitation would be recorded around the speedway. It would be enough rain to delay the race from lap 241 to lap 256.

Cotton Owens would retire as a NASCAR race car owner after this race. David Pearson would be prevented from tying Richard Petty's record of ten consecutive wins at this race. Pearson would end up racking a 105 victories. Bobby Allison skipped this race to do the 1973 Indianapolis 500.

Introductions to NASCAR
Peter Gregg would make his only NASCAR Cup Series start at this event. Billy Scott-Union,S.C. BD 8/9/1935 and Charlie Blanton would start their respective NASCAR careers at this race and would race for several others.

Race results

References

World 600
World 600
NASCAR races at Charlotte Motor Speedway